Christopher Leslie Park (born 23 July 1983) is an English cricketer. Park is a right-handed batsman who plays primarily as a wicketkeeper.

In 2001, Park made his debut for Dorset in the Minor Counties Championship against Cornwall. From 2001 to the present, he has represented the county in 27 Minor Counties matches.

In 2001, Park made his List-A debut for Dorset against Scotland in the 2nd round of the 2002 Cheltenham & Gloucester Trophy, which was played in 2001. Parks second and to date last List-A appearance for Dorset came against Yorkshire in the 2nd round of the 2004 Cheltenham & Gloucester Trophy.

Park also played a single List-A match for the Northamptonshire Cricket Board against the Yorkshire Cricket Board in the 2003 Cheltenham & Gloucester Trophy which was played in 2002.

External links
Chris Park at Cricinfo
Chris Park at CricketArchive

1983 births
Living people
Cricketers from Poole
English cricketers
Dorset cricketers
Northamptonshire Cricket Board cricketers
Wicket-keepers